Conus alconnelli, common name, the Lemonglass cone is a species of sea snail, a marine gastropod mollusk in the family Conidae, the cone snails and their allies.

Like all species within the genus Conus, these snails are predatory and venomous. They are capable of "stinging" humans, therefore live ones should be handled carefully or not at all.

Description
The sizeof the shell varies between 27.5 mm and 90 mm.

Distribution
This species occurs in the Indian Ocean from Southeast Africa and Madagascar to Oman; and off the Mascarenes and Northern Transkei, South Africa

References

 Tucker J.K. & Tenorio M.J. (2009) Systematic classification of Recent and fossil conoidean gastropods. Hackenheim: Conchbooks. 296 pp.
Conus pennasilicorum (Gastropoda: Prosobranchia: Conidae) a new species from South-East Africa. Malacologia Mostra Mondiale 94: 19-21
 Puillandre N., Duda T.F., Meyer C., Olivera B.M. & Bouchet P. (2015). One, four or 100 genera? A new classification of the cone snails. Journal of Molluscan Studies. 81: 1–23

External links
 The Conus Biodiversity website
 Cone Shells – Knights of the Sea
 Gastropods.com: Kioconus alconnelli
 Specimen at MNHN, Paris

alconnelli
Gastropods described in 1986